Mercedes Cebrián (born 29 May 1971) is a Spanish writer and translator.

Biography
Mercedes Cebrián holds a licentiate in Information Sciences from the Complutense University of Madrid, a master's degree in Hispanic Cultural Studies from Birkbeck, University of London, and one in Hispanic Studies from the University of Pennsylvania.

She has written for various media outlets, such as the La Vanguardia supplement Culturas, Babelia and El Viajero of El País, and her texts have appeared in the literary magazines Turia, Gatopardo, Revista de Occidente, and Letras Libres, as well as Columbia University's Circumference. She has been a columnist for the newspaper Público.

Cebrián began her writing career with prose, but in the first half of the 2000s she also opted for poetry. In this regard, the author explains:

Her book of short stories and poems El malestar al alcance de todos was published in 2004.

After the publication of La nueva taxidermia, a book that brings together two novellas,  from El Cultural commented:

Mercedes Cebrián has been associated with the Nocilla Generation, an evaluation with which she does not agree, although she recognizes that with her "there are points of intersection, such as an interest in talking about the contemporary world."

Cebrián denied this outright. She also refused to accept mediation from the Association of Translators, which offered to work out a ruling on the alleged plagiarism if both parties accepted its arbitration. The controversy had an impact on social networks and websites, in cultural journals (such as El Cultural and Estado Crítico), and in the press itself, as well as in translation trade publications, such as that of the Literary Translators Club of Buenos Aires, with input from Jorge Fondebrider.

Publications
 El malestar al alcance de todos, stories and poems, Caballo de Troya, Madrid, 2004, 
 Mercado común, poems, Caballo de Troya, Madrid, 2006, 
 13 viajes in vitro, chronicles, Blur Ediciones, Madrid, 2008, 
 Cul-de-sac, short stories, Alpha Decay, Barcelona, 2009
 La nueva taxidermia, Mondadori, Barcelona 2011, ; containing two novellas:
 Qué inmortal he sido and Voz de dar malas noticias
 Oremos por nuestros pasaportes, anthology, Mondadori Argentina, Buenos Aires, 2012; containing: El malestar al alcance de todos, Mercado común, La nueva taxidermia, and an assorted "bonus track", 
 El genuino sabor, novel, Literatura Random House, Barcelona, 2014, 
 Verano azul: unas vacaciones en el corazón de la transición, essay, Alpha Decay, Barcelona, 2016, 
 Malgastar, poetry, La Bella Varsovia, 2016,

As editor
 Madrid, con perdón, anthology of texts about Madrid; Caballo de Troya, 2012,

Translations
 2008 – The Architecture of Happiness, by Alain de Botton (Lumen)
 2008 – , by Georges Perec (Impedimenta)
 2009 – A Man Asleep, by Georges Perec (Impedimenta)
 2010 – , by Georges Perec (Impedimenta)
 2011 – Saturday Night and Sunday Morning, by Alan Sillitoe (Impedimenta)
 2011 – It Chooses You, by Miranda July (Seix Barral)
 2012 – The Loneliness of the Long-Distance Runner, by Alan Sillitoe; prologue by Kiko Amat (Impedimenta)
 2013 – The Universe Versus Alex Woods, by Gavin Extence (Seix Barral)
 2013 – Y revenir, by Dominique Ané (Alpha Decay)
 2013 – Sempre Susan, by Sigrid Nunez (Errata Naturae)
 2017 – , by Georges Perec (Impedimenta)

References

External links

 

1971 births
21st-century Spanish poets
21st-century Spanish women writers
Alumni of Birkbeck, University of London
Complutense University of Madrid alumni
English–Spanish translators
French–Spanish translators
Living people
Spanish translators
Spanish women poets
Spanish women short story writers
Spanish short story writers
University of Pennsylvania alumni
Writers from Madrid
21st-century translators